Pierre-Louis or Pierre Louis is a given name and a surname. Notable people with the name include:

Given name
Pierre-Louis Bentabole (1756–1798), revolutionary Frenchman
Pierre-Louis Billaudèle (1796–1869), priest from, and educated in, France who spent over 30 years of his service in Canada
Pierre Louis Jean Casimir de Blacas, 1st Prince of Blacas (1771–1839), French antiquarian, nobleman and diplomat during the Bourbon Restoration
Pierre Louis de Broglie (1892–1987), French physicist who made groundbreaking contributions to quantum theory
Pierre Louis Napoleon Cavagnari KCB CSI (1841–1879), British military administrator
Pierre Louis Alphée Cazenave (1795–1877), French dermatologist who practiced medicine at the Hôpital Saint-Louis in Paris
Pierre Louis Antoine Cordier (1777–1861), French geologist and mineralogist, and a founder of the French Geological Society
Pierre-Louis Cretey (1635–1702), French baroque painter and one of the leading masters in the Lyonnaise school
Pierre-Louis Dietsch (1808–1865), French composer and conductor
Pierre-Louis Dieufaite (1983–2014), Haitian actor, known for his supporting role in the award-winning film Love Me Haiti
Pierre Louis Dulong FRS FRSE IOF (1785–1838), French physicist and chemist, remembered for the law of Dulong and Petit
Pierre Louis Dumesnil (1698–1781), French painter who specialized in genre scenes
Pierre-Louis Dupas (1761–1823), French soldier who rose to prominence during the French Revolutionary Wars
Pierre Louis Alfred Duprat, Governor in French Colonial Empire
Pierre Louis Charles de Failly (1810–1892), French general
Pierre-Louis Ginguené (1748–1816), French author
Pierre-Louis Van Gobbelschroy (1784–1850), conservative politician of the United Kingdom of the Netherlands
(Pierre Louis) Philippe de La Guêpière (1715–1773), French architect
Pierre Louis Jean Ivolas (1842–1908), French naturalist
Pierre Louis de Lacretelle (1751–1824), French lawyer, politician and writer
Pierre-Louis Lions (born 1956), French mathematician
Pierre Louis-Dreyfus (1908–2011), French-born Resistance fighter during World War II who later served as CEO of the Louis Dreyfus Cie
Jean-Pierre-Louis de Luchet (1740–1792), French journalist, essayist, and theatre manager
Pierre Louis Manuel (1751–1793), French writer and political figure of the Revolution
Pierre-Louis Binet de Marcognet (1765–1854), fought in the American Revolutionary War
Pierre Louis Maupertuis (1698–1759), French mathematician, philosopher and man of letters
Pierre-Louis Moline (1740–1820), prolific French dramatist, poet and librettist
Pierre-Louis Moreau-Desproux (1727–1793), pioneering French neoclassical architect
Pierre-Louis Panet (1761–1812), Canadian lawyer, notary, seigneur, judge and political figure in Lower Canada
Pierre Louis Parisis (1795–1866), the Roman Catholic bishop of the Bishopric of Langres from 1835 to 1851
Pierre Louis Prieur (1756–1827), French lawyer elected to the Estates-General of 1789
Pierre Louis Roederer (1754–1835), French politician, economist, and historian, politically active in the era of the French Revolution and First French Republic
Pierre Louis Rouillard (1820–1881), French sculptor known for his sculptures of animals
Pierre Louis de Saffon (1724–1784), French duelist that escaped to exile in the Dutch colony of Demerara, becoming a wealthy landowner
Pierre-Louis Thévenet, French production designer, art director and set decorator
Pierre Louis Vasquez (1798–1868), mountain man and trader
Pierre Louis Francois Leveque de Vilmorin (1816–1860), devoted his life to biology and chemistry, and the breeding and cultivation of plants
 Pierre-Louis (actor) (1917–1987), French actor and film director

Surname
Manoucheka Pierre Louis (born 1989), Haitian women's association football player
Damase Pierre-Louis (1894–1945), Haitian historian, statesman, author, journalist and diplomat
Jean-Claude Pierre-Louis, the Chief Executive of Rodrigues Island, Mauritius between October 24, 2004, and March 2010
Joseph Nemours Pierre-Louis (1900–1966), served as acting President of Haiti from 1956 to 1957
Kevin Pierre-Louis (born 1991), American football linebacker for the Seattle Seahawks of the National Football League (NFL)
Listner Pierre-Louis (born 1989), Haitian-French football player
Michèle Pierre-Louis (born 1947), Haitian politician who was Prime Minister of Haiti from September 2008 to November 2009
Prosper Pierre-Louis (1947–1997), Haitian artist, painter and contributor to the local school of the Saint Soleil art movement
Ricardo Pierre-Louis (born 1984), Haitian soccer player, currently without a club
Sharon Pierre-Louis, American actress

See also
Pierre Louis de Blacas d'Aulps ministry, Government of the first Bourbon restoration
Pierre Louÿs